Visitors to the United Arab Emirates must obtain a visa prior to travel, unless they come from one of the visa-exempt countries or one of the countries whose citizens are eligible for visa on arrival.

Citizens of member nations of the Gulf Cooperation Council have freedom of movement in the UAE.

All visitors visiting the United Arab Emirates must hold a passport valid for at least 6 months, or 3 months if holding a residency permit. Gulf Cooperation Council nationals need only show a government-issued ID card.

Visa policy map

Visa exemption or free visa on arrival

Nationals of the following countries and territories may either enter the United Arab Emirates without a visa or are eligible to obtain a free UAE visa on arrival:

ID — May enter with an ID card.
1 — Not applicable to passports stamped "Article 17, paragraph 2".
2 — For holders of biometric passports only.
3 — For holders of normal passports only; non-ordinary passports are visa-exempt for 90 days within any 180 days instead.
4 — Also including holders of passports for public affairs.
5 – Only applicable for British citizens, British Overseas Territories citizens and British Subjects who have a certificate of entitlement to the right of abode.

Substitute visas
Citizens of  who are valid visa holders or residents of the United States, or who are residents of the European Union, are eligible to obtain a free 14 day visa on arrival. 

The UAE has also introduced a new Green Visa for people with bachelors degrees who earn Dh15,000 ($4,084) or more per month. The five-year visa policy would offer greater stability and flexibility to middle-income workers in the education sector and attract new talent to the Emirates.

Golden Visa

The Golden Visa was invoked by the government of the United Arab Emirates in 2019, under Cabinet Resolution No.56 of Organization of Residence Permits for Investors, Entrepreneurs and Professional Talent, 2018. This colossal move was made to make Dubai, investors and industrial friendly and catalyze global tourism, specifically to Dubai. The UAE Golden Visa costs $136,000 for investors.

Diplomatic and service category passports

In addition to nations whose citizens are visa exempt, holders of diplomatic or service category passports of Albania, Algeria, Azerbaijan, Belarus, Cameroon, Central African Republic, Colombia, Congo, Cuba, Egypt, Equatorial Guinea, Georgia, Grenada, India, Indonesia, Liberia, Morocco, Rwanda, Saint Lucia, Serbia, Tonga, Tunisia, Turkey, Turkmenistan, Vanuatu and Vietnam and holders of diplomatic passports of Armenia, Burkina Faso, Burundi, Chad, Congo DR, Ethiopia, Guinea, Jordan, Kyrgyzstan, Mali, Mauritania, Niger, Senegal, Uzbekistan also do not require a visa or can obtain a free visa on arrival.

Future changes
United Arab Emirates has signed visa exemption agreements with the following countries that are not yet ratified or applied:

 - on 9 December 2020 for diplomatic and service passports
 - November 2020
 - on 23 September 2019
 - on 23 April 2019
 – on 21 October 2017 for all passports
 – on 25 February 2017 for diplomatic passports

Transit visa
Passengers on all international airlines may enter the United Arab Emirates for 96 hours after obtaining a transit visa at the airport. The time difference between the two flights must be over 8 hours and the passenger must continue to a third destination. Passengers also must have a hotel booking. This is not applicable to nationals of Afghanistan, Iraq, Niger, Syria, Somalia, and Yemen.

All travellers in transit are exempt from entry fees for the first 48 hours; this brief entry may be extended for up to 96 hours for a fee of 50 AED.

Requirements for visa application
For all others nationals who are not granted visa-free or visa on arrival, UAE visas rules vary according to nationality, age and gender. 
For example, for Moroccans, Algerians, Libyans, Syrians, Mauritanians and Tunisians, the minimum age requirement to apply for a visa is 40. For other nationalities, the minimum age requirement to apply for a visa is 21 for men and 23 for women.

Airline visas
Visitors normally require a sponsor but visas can also be arranged online through an airline if they are arriving on Air Arabia, Air Astana, Emirates, Etihad (and Air Baltic and Air Serbia), flydubai, Turkish Airlines and Indigo Airlines

Admission restrictions
In addition to a visa, nationals of  entering the United Arab Emirates are required to hold a hotel booking or an accommodation address for the whole period of their intended stay.

Additionally, nationals of  who hold a "business passport" are refused entry into the United Arab Emirates, but are allowed to transit in the UAE.

Use for other countries
UAE visas or residence permits are accepted as substitute visas for national visas or they allow for simplified entry procedures in the following countries:
 — Nationals of India with a UAE residence permit may obtain a visa on arrival valid for up to 120 days.
 — UAE residents can obtain a visa on arrival for a maximum stay of 30 days if they have a residence permit valid for at least 6 months from the arrival date.
 — UAE residents and visa holders may enter and stay in Georgia without visa for 90 calendar days in any 180-day period. UAE visa and/or a residence permit must be valid on the day of entry into Georgia.
 — Nationals of Algeria, Bangladesh, Egypt, India, Jordan, Lebanon, Morocco, Nepal, Pakistan, Sri Lanka and Tunisia who are UAE residents can apply for a visa on arrival valid for 30 days.

Visitor statistics

Emirate of Dubai
Most visitors arriving to Emirate of Dubai were from the following countries of nationality:

Emirate of Abu Dhabi
Hotel guests checking in hotels in the Emirate of Abu Dhabi were from the following countries of nationality:

See also

Visa requirements for Emirati citizens

Notes

References

External links
Ministry of Foreign Affairs of the UAE
Emirati E-visa for sponsored individuals

United Arab Emirates
Government of the United Arab Emirates